Nickell Homestead and Mill, also known as Mont Glenn Farm, is a historic home, grist mill, and national historic district located at Secondcreek, near Ronceverte, Monroe County, West Virginia.  The district includes seven contributing buildings. The original section of the main house was built about 1820, with additions made in 1858, and about 1900. It is a -story, six bay brick and frame Federal style dwelling. The 1900 addition has some Colonial Revival style details. Also on the property is a two-story mill built in 1814, a barn (c. 1940s), machine shed (c. 1920s), hog shed (c. 1900), garage (c. 1920), and house by the mill (c. 1920).  The Nickell mill closed in 1949. The property upon which the mill stood was sold in 2014 or 2015. The new owner tore down the mill. The only thing remaining is the stone foundation. The new owner is not maintaining the property and the house is also falling into disrepair. One wonders why this person bought an historic property only to destroy it.

It was listed on the National Register of Historic Places in 1998.

References

Houses on the National Register of Historic Places in West Virginia
Grinding mills on the National Register of Historic Places in West Virginia
Historic districts on the National Register of Historic Places in West Virginia
Federal architecture in West Virginia
Colonial Revival architecture in West Virginia
Houses completed in 1814
Houses in Monroe County, West Virginia
Grinding mills in West Virginia
National Register of Historic Places in Monroe County, West Virginia
Historic districts in Monroe County, West Virginia
Farms on the National Register of Historic Places in West Virginia
1814 establishments in Virginia